Atomic Brain Invasion is a 2010 American science fiction horror film directed by Richard Griffin. The film premiered in August 2010, and released to DVD on October 12, 2012.

Premise
When a spacecraft carrying an intergalactic plague crash-lands in a small New England town, it's up to a group of high schoolers and an alien abductee to stop the army of slime-spewing brain creatures from their one goal: kidnapping Elvis Presley!

Cast

References

External links
 
 
 https://web.archive.org/web/20140727023414/http://www.best-horror-movies.com/review?name=atomic-brain-invasion-2012-review
 https://web.archive.org/web/20140714115956/http://www.cinema-suicide.com/2010/10/14/atomic-brain-invasion-review/

2010 films
2010s science fiction horror films
2010 horror films
American science fiction horror films
2010s English-language films
2010s American films